Austrophthalma raffrayi is a species of beetle in the family Latridiidae, the only species in the genus Austrophthalma.

References

Monotypic Cucujiformia genera
Latridiidae genera